Eglinton was a federal electoral district in Ontario, Canada, that was represented in the House of Commons of Canada from 1935 to 1979. This riding was created in 1933 from parts of Toronto Northeast riding. 
 
It initially consisted of Ward Nine of the city of Toronto.

In 1966, it was redefined to consist of the part of Metropolitan Toronto bounded as follows: from the intersection of the Canadian National Railway line and Yonge Street, north along Yonge Street, west along Cameron Avenue, north along Easton Street, west along Sheppard Avenue West, south along Bathurst Street, southwest along Highway 401, south along the Spadina Expressway, Beechmount Avenue and Benner Avenue, east along Briar Hill Avenue, south along Castlewood Road, east along Eglinton Avenue, south along Elmsthorpe Avenue, and southeast along the C.N.R. line to Yonge Street.

The electoral district was abolished in 1976 when it was redistributed between Eglinton—Lawrence, St. Paul's and Willowdale ridings.

Members of Parliament

This riding has elected the following Members of Parliament:

Election results

|}

|}

|}

|}

|}

 
|Liberal Conservative Coalition
|George Rolland
|align="right"| 252
|}

|}

|}

|}

|}

|}

|}

|}

On Mr. Sharp's resignation, 2 May 1978:

|}

See also 

 List of Canadian federal electoral districts
 Past Canadian electoral districts

Further reading

External links 
Riding history from the Library of Parliament

Former federal electoral districts of Ontario
Federal electoral districts of Toronto